Palliakaranai Thirumalai Narasimhan (1928–2013), popularly known as PTN or Jim, was an Indian theoretical chemist, one of the pioneers of computational chemistry in India and a professor at the Indian Institute of Technology, Kanpur. He was known for his studies on quantum-mechanical interpretation of magnetic resonance data and his contributions in developing IIT Kanpur into a Centre of Excellence in academic research in basic sciences. He was an elected fellow of the Indian National Science Academy, Indian Academy of Sciences and the National Academy of Sciences, India. The Council of Scientific and Industrial Research, the apex agency of the Government of India for scientific research, awarded him the Shanti Swarup Bhatnagar Prize for Science and Technology, one of the highest Indian science awards, in 1970, for his contributions to chemical sciences.

Biography 

P. T. Narasimhan, born on 28 July 1928 in Cuddalore, a coastal town in the south Indian state of Tamil Nadu, did his graduate studies (BSc) at Madras Christian College of the University of Madras and passed a master's degree also from the same college. Subsequently, he joined the Indian Institute of Science  and secured a PhD in physical chemistry in 1955  under his Ph.D. mentor R. S. Krishnan.  His post-doctoral research was at the laboratory of Max T. Rogers of the Michigan State University from 1957 to 1959 and with Martin Karplus, the recipient of Nobel Prize in Chemistry in 2013 during 1959 to 1961; starting at University of Illinois and when Karplus moved to Columbia University, Narasimhan followed him. He returned to India to join the Indian Institute of Technology, Kanpur in 1962 as an assistant professor where he became a professor in 1965 and stayed there till his superannuation in 1988. After retirement from academic service, he moved his base to Pasadena, California where he continued his researches at Huntington Medical Research Institutes and later, at Beckman Institute of California Institute of Technology.

Narasimhan was married to Leena and the couple had two daughters, Nalini and Nandini, and a son, Vikram in between. The family lived in Sunnyvale and it was here he died on 3 May 2013, at the age of 84, survived by his wife, children and six grand children.  Narasimhan was known to have been competent in carnatic music and performed at various stages as a flautist in the US and in India.

Legacy 
Narasimhan, who chose physical chemistry for his researches for PhD, focused on the theory of nuclear spin coupling constants during his stint at Martin Karplus' laboratory; his mentor would go on to propound the Karplus equation which describes the correlation between coupling constants and dihedral angles in proton nuclear magnetic resonance spectroscopy. His studies of the structure and properties of molecules were based on quantum-mechanical interpretation of magnetic resonance data and those studies assisted in widening the understanding of chemical bonding, conformation, chemical reactivity and electrical and magnetic properties of molecules. His contributions helped in the development of dynamic nuclear polarization at X-band in India, covering both the instrumentation and chemical applications.

Some of the important contributions from Narasimhan were in the field of computational chemistry and the work of his research school at the IITK was reported to have pioneered the discipline in India. He and his colleagues developed indigenously-built phase locked super-regenerative oscillator-detectors and pulsed Nuclear quadrupole resonance (NQR) double resonance system. They also investigated the high resolution nuclear magnetic resonance of small molecules dissolved in liquid crystalline, the alternating linewidth in Electron Spin Resonance, coupling constants in nuclear magnetic resonance, and Sternheimer shielding and anti-shielding factors employing Hartree–Fock method. His expertise in the field prompted Institute of Nuclear Medicine and Allied Sciences to seek his assistance when they decided to establish one of the first magnetic resonance imaging facilities in the country which he successfully accomplished. He also worked on developing a magnetic resonance microscopy as an imaging tool for biological research.

Narasimhan published over 200 articles in peer-reviewed journals and mentored 20 doctoral researchers. His doctoral and masters students included Shridhar Ramachandra Gadre, K. D. Sen, N. Chandrakumar, S Shankar, and Manvendra Krishna Dubey, MS 1979,  and he guided many researchers in their work. He organized an active research school at the Indian Institute of Technology, Kanpur featuring scholars from physics and chemistry departments which worked on the theoretical and experimental aspects of magnetic resonance. As the head of the department of chemistry, he assisted the department to develop into a centre of excellence in chemical research. He was one of the founders of the Association of Magnetic Resonance Spectroscopists of India and served as its secretary. He was associated with the International Society of Magnetic Resonance as a member of its council and chaired the national advisory committee of the IX International Symposium on Nuclear Quadrupole Resonance held in Kanpur in 1988. He also served as the general secretary of the National Academy of Sciences, India for four terms from 1977 to 1980.

Awards and honors 
The Council of Scientific and Industrial Research awarded Narasimhan the Shanti Swarup Bhatnagar Prize, one of the highest Indian science awards, in 1970. In 1980, he received the Sir C. V. Raman Award for Research in Physical Sciences of the University Grants Commission of India. He has delivered several award orations including the Professor R. K. Asundi Endowment Lecture of the Indian National Science Academy, Acharya J. C. Ghosh Memorial Lecture of the Indian Chemical Society and Mitra Memorial Lecture of the University of Delhi. He was an elected fellow of the Indian Academy of Sciences (1971), the National Academy of Sciences, India and the Indian National Science Academy (1972) and an Institute Fellow of the Indian Institute of Technology, Kanpur (2013). The Archive for Organic Chemistry issued a festschrift on him by way of volume VIII in 2004. Srinivasa Ramanujan Institute for Basic Sciences (SRIBS) and Indian Institute of Information Technology and Management, Kerala jointly conducted a four-day national workshop on computational chemistry in June 2013 which was dedicated to the memory of Narasimhan.

Selected bibliography

See also 
 Martin Karplus
 Shridhar Ramachandra Gadre

Notes

References

External links

Further reading 
 

Recipients of the Shanti Swarup Bhatnagar Award in Chemical Science
1928 births
2013 deaths
People from Cuddalore district
Tamil scientists
20th-century Indian chemists
Indian physical chemists
Indian computational chemists
Indian scientific authors
Madras Christian College alumni
University of Madras alumni
Indian Institute of Science alumni
Michigan State University alumni
University of Illinois Urbana-Champaign alumni
Columbia University alumni
Fellows of the Indian Academy of Sciences
Fellows of the Indian National Science Academy
Fellows of The National Academy of Sciences, India
Scientists from Tamil Nadu
Indian Tamil academics